Andrew Rogers (born 15 August 1964) is a former Australian rules footballer who played with Essendon and Geelong in the VFL/AFL.

Originally from South Australian National Football League (SANFL) club Woodville, Rogers was recruited by Essendon with pick six in the 1987 VFL Draft. He had played 63 games at Woodville from his debut in 1985 and in 1987 represented South Australia in interstate matches against Victoria and Western Australia, performing well enough to be selected in the All-Australian team.

Rogers made eight senior appearances for Essendon in 1988 but after being unable to cement his place in the side crossed to Geelong. He was at Geelong for four seasons, playing finals football, including the 1992 AFL Grand Final which they lost and was to be his last game in the league.
 
When he returned to South Australia in 1993 he rejoined his old club Woodville who, while Rogers was in the AFL, had merged to become Woodville-West Torrens. As vice-captain, Rogers played in their inaugural premiership team that year, with a Grand Final victory over Norwood. He was club captain from 1995 to 2000 and just like with his AFL stint, his SANFL career ended in a losing Grand Final. The 2001 decider was his 179th and last game for the merged club, for whom he won 'best and fairests' in 1993, 1995 and 1996.

Rogers coached North Shore Australian Football Club in the Sydney AFL competition in 2022, taking the Bombers to the Grand Final in his first season at the helm; but it would be another losing Grand Final.

References

Andrew Rogers at the SANFL Hall of Fame
Holmesby, Russell and Main, Jim (2007). The Encyclopedia of AFL Footballers. 7th ed. Melbourne: Bas Publishing.

1964 births
Living people
Essendon Football Club players
Geelong Football Club players
Woodville-West Torrens Football Club players
Woodville Football Club players
All-Australians (1953–1988)
Australian rules footballers from South Australia
South Australian Football Hall of Fame inductees
South Australian State of Origin players